The Chicago Majors was a basketball team based in Chicago, Illinois, that was a member of the American Basketball League from 1961 to 1963.

History
The American Basketball League played one full season, 1961–1962, and part of the next season until the league folded on December 31, 1962. The ABL was the first basketball league to have a three point shot for baskets scored far away from the goal. Other rules that set the league apart were a 30-second shooting clock and a wider free throw lane, 18 feet instead of the standard 12.

The American Basketball League was formed when Abe Saperstein did not get the Los Angeles National Basketball Association (NBA) franchise he sought. His Harlem Globetrotters had strong NBA ties.  When Minneapolis Lakers owner Bob Short was permitted to move the Lakers to Los Angeles, Saperstein reacted by convincing National Alliance of Basketball Leagues (NABL) team owner Paul Cohen (Tuck Tapers) and Amateur Athletic Union (AAU) National Champion Cleveland Pipers owner George Steinbrenner to take the top NABL and AAU teams and players and form a rival league.

League franchises were: the Chicago Majors (1961–1963); Cleveland Pipers (1961–1962); Kansas City Steers (1961–63); Long Beach Chiefs (1961–1963), as Hawaii Chiefs in 1961–62; Los Angeles Jets (1961–62, disbanded during season); Oakland Oaks (1961–1963, as San Francisco Saints in 1961–1962; Philadelphia Tapers 1961–1963, as Washington Tapers in 1961–62; moved to New York during 1961–62 season; as New York Tapers in 1961–62 and the Pittsburgh Rens (1961–1963).

The Majors were owned by Abe Saperstein. Former Globetrotter Ermer Robinson was the team's business manager for their two seasons. Chicago native Ron Sobieszczyk came out of retirement to play for the Majors. In 1961 Chicago was coached by Andy Phillip.

The Majors finished 38–42 in 1960–1961 under Phillip, finishing third in the ABL Eastern Division. In 1962–1963 they finished 8–19 under Ron "Sobie" Sobieszczyk, folding along with the entire league on December 31, 1962.

The arena
The Majors played in Chicago Stadium, which later became the home stadium of the Chicago Bulls.

Notable players

 Bucky Bolyard
 Jeff Cohen
 Kelly Coleman
 Nat Clifton
 Mel Davis
 Tony Jackson
 John F. Sullivan
 Roger Taylor
 Herschell Turner
 John Wessels

1962 ABL draft selections
Territorial selections
Chet Walker (Bradley University)
Dave DeBusschere (University of Detroit)
First round
Don Nelson (University of Iowa)

Additional selections

Bud Olsen (University of Louisville)
Armand Reo (University of Notre Dame)
Jim Hudock (University of North Carolina)
Russ Marvel (North Carolina State University)
Larry Pursiful (University of Kentucky)
Mike Cingiser (Brown University)

Bob Bolton (Western Michigan University)
Alfred Kaemmerling (Princeton University)
Lindburg Moody (South Carolina State College)
Frank Snyder (Memphis State University)
Ralph Wells (Northwestern University)
Bucky Keller (Virginia Polytechnic University)

Year-by-year

References

American Basketball League (1961–62) teams
Majors